Pierre A Harper (born 2 March 1957) is a British fencer. He competed in the individual and team foil events at the 1980, 1984 and 1988 Summer Olympics. He was a six times British fencing champion, winning six foil titles at the British Fencing Championships, from 1978 to 1988.

References

1957 births
Living people
British male fencers
Olympic fencers of Great Britain
Fencers at the 1980 Summer Olympics
Fencers at the 1984 Summer Olympics
Fencers at the 1988 Summer Olympics
Sportspeople from London